Björn Phau was the defending champion but he retired in the first round.
Michael Berrer defeated Jan-Lennard Struff 7–5, 6–3 in the final to win the title.

Seeds

Draw

Finals

Top half

Bottom half

References
 Main Draw
 Qualifying Draw

Intersport Heilbronn Open - Singles
2013 Singles